City Gate, formerly Büro Center Nibelungenplatz (known as BCN) and even prior Shell Tower, is a 27-storey,   skyscraper in the Nordend-West district of Frankfurt, Germany. It is located at Nibelungenplatz, a busy junction in the Nordend.

History

Construction 
Büro Center Nibelungenplatz was designed by Novotny Mähner Assoziierte and part of the entire northern Alleenring comprehensive development plan, which provided for conversion to freeway and spot high-rises at all major intersections. The plan was however not followed up at another building at the intersection with the highway Eschersheimer further. The skyscraper at Nibelungenplatz was built from 1964 to 1966 for the oil companies Shell and was then the first skyscraper in Frankfurt,  to reach . In the cellar - the fear of nuclear war at that time according to established - for an emergency fallout shelter, which is used as a garage.

Reconstruction 
The original facade following the sober international style, made up of suspended aluminum plates, no longer exists. In 1993 the tower was renovated by Novotny Mähner Assoziierte, by cladding it in the current post-modern glass facade and equipping it with a panoramic lift.

Tenants
City Gate was until 2013 a permanent shooting location for the ZDF television series Ein Fall für zwei (A Case for Two), because the lawyer has his fictional law firm in that building. The panoramic view over Frankfurt's skyline shown in the episodes is a distinctive feature of the series. The tower is also headquarters of the General Consulate of the Kingdom of Spain. Other tenants include the Frankfurt University of Applied Sciences, Merz Pharma, M. Page, Financial Times Europe, SCF, mediomind, REWE and a Subway restaurant.

See also 
 List of tallest buildings in Frankfurt
 List of tallest buildings in Germany

References

Skyscrapers in Frankfurt
Skyscraper office buildings in Germany
Office buildings completed in 1966